Yahya Otain (born 9 March 1990) is a Saudi professional footballer who plays as a midfielder for Al-Nairyah.

Honours
Al-Ettifaq
First Division: 2015–16

Al-Khaleej 
First Division: 2021–22

References

External links 
 

1990 births
Living people
Saudi Arabian footballers
Ras Tanura SC players
Al-Ahli Saudi FC players
Ettifaq FC players
Al-Raed FC players
Al-Nahda Club (Saudi Arabia) players
Khaleej FC players
Al-Nairyah Club players
Saudi First Division League players
Saudi Professional League players
Saudi Second Division players
Association football midfielders